"Il venait d'avoir 18 ans" ("He had just turned 18") is a song by French singer Dalida, first released on album Julien in second half of 1973. The song was a success and has become Dalida's signature track.

In 1974 Dalida released the song on the B-side of her single "Gigi l'amoroso".

The song, which reached the 13th place in the German charts and 33rd in the Italian charts, won the Prize of the Academy of the French Record in 1975, and was later recorded in five languages (German, Spanish, Italian, Japanese and English), benefiting from an exit single for each of them.

History 
This song evokes Dalida's secret relationship, at 34 years old, with a young 18-year-old Italian student. At that time, she gets pregnant and chooses to have an abortion, but the operation makes her sterile. It is this tragedy which inspired her to sing about this impossible relationship. The text of the song makes a reference to love for young people felt by mature women. It is reminiscent of other works such as Colette's Green Wheat, published in 1923.

Dalida also recorded the song in Italian under the title "18 anni" ("Diciottanni").

Track listings 
7-inch single Sonopresse IS 45 716 (1974, France)
7-inch single Omega OM 39.058 Y (1974, Belgium)
7-inch single Omega OM 39.058 (1974, Netherlands)
7-inch single Poplandia P-30573 (1974, Spain)
CD single Barclay 9240 (1999, France)
A. "Gigi l'amoroso (Gigi l'amour)" (6:59)
B. "Il venait d'avoir 18 ans" (2:50)

7-inch EP Zip Zip 10.057/E (1974, Portugal)
A. "Gigi l'amoroso (Gigi l'amour)" (6:59)
B1. "Vado via" (3:40)
B2. "Il venait d'avoir 18 ans" (2:50)

Charts

References

External links 
 Il venait d'avoir 18 ans on Youtube
 Il venait d'avoir 18 ans, INA

Songs about teenagers
Songs about old age
Songs about pregnancy
Songs about abortion
1973 songs
1974 singles
Dalida songs
Ultratop 50 Singles (Wallonia) number-one singles
Number-one singles in France
Star Academy France songs
Lara Fabian songs